The Vilnius–Lublin Portal is a public attraction that videoconferences between separate outdoor structures in Vilnius, Lithuania, and Lublin, Poland.

Description 

The portal connects Vilnius, Lithuania, and Lublin, Poland, through large, public structures that use videoconference technology, with a camera showing one location on the screen of the other.

Development 

Benediktas Gylys conceived the portal concept with the desire to unify and develop empathy in onlookers. The project is a joint venture between the Benediktas Gylys Foundation, the Cities of Vilnius and Lublin, and the latter's Center for Intercultural Creative Initiatives. The portal took five years to develop into its final form. Engineers from Vilnius Gediminas Technical University's Creativity and Innovation Center designed the portal. It was designed as a circle to recall themes of time and from science fiction. Each portal weighs 11 tons.

The project totaled  in costs. The project had won a competition to spur tourism in Vilnius, the Lithuanian capital city.

The group plans future portals from Vilnius to Reykjavik and London.

Reception 

A writer for The Verge likened the portal to creations from the Stargate media universe.

References

Further reading

External links 

 

2021 introductions
Tourist attractions in Vilnius
Tourist attractions in Lublin Voivodeship